Romance Joe is a 2011 South Korean comedy drama film written and directed by first-time director Lee Kwang-kuk and stars Kim Young-pil, Shin Dong-mi and Lee Chae-eun. It made its world premiere in the Korean Cinema Today and won the Citizen Critics' Award at the 16th Busan International Film Festival in 2011.

Plot
The story focuses on the plight of a suicidal man.

Cast
 Kim Young-pil as Romance Joe
 Lee David as young Romance Joe
 Shin Dong-mi as teashop girl 
 Lee Chae-eun as Cho-hee
 Jo Han-chul as Director Lee 
 Kim Dong-hyeon as Seo-dam/police
 Kim Sae-byuk as nurse

Awards and nominations

References

External links
 
 
 

2011 films
South Korean comedy-drama films
2010s Korean-language films
Films directed by Lee Kwang-kuk
2010s South Korean films